Clinton Thompson Horton (1876 – 1953) was an American lawyer and politician from New York.

Life
Horton was born on October 31, 1876 in Petrolia, Butler County, Pennsylvania. He was the son of Elmer Horton and Christine (Thompson) Horton. 

The family moved first to Silver Creek, New York, then to Buffalo. He graduated from Cornell University, B.A. in 1898, and LL.B. in 1899. At Cornell, he became a member of the Delta Chi fraternity. Then he practiced law in Buffalo. On July 2, 1903, he married Madge Marie Bates, and they had two children: Roger Bates Horton (1907–1941) and Virginia Horton (born 1911).

Horton was a member of the New York State Assembly (Erie Co., 2nd D.) in 1912, 1913 and 1914; and was Chairman of the Committee on Insurance in 1914.

He was a member of the New York State Senate (48th D.) in 1915 and 1916; and was Chairman of the Committee on Civil Service.

He was a member of the Erie County Board of Child Welfare from 1918 to 1921; and a justice of the New York Supreme Court (8th D.) from 1922 to 1935. Afterwards he was a Referee for the Supreme Court.

He died on January 25, 1953.

Sources
Courts and Lawyers of New York (1925; pg. 1263)
CLINTON T. HORTON in NYT on January 27, 1953 (subscription required)

1876 births
1953 deaths
Republican Party New York (state) state senators
Politicians from Buffalo, New York
Republican Party members of the New York State Assembly
New York Supreme Court Justices
People from Butler County, Pennsylvania
People from Silver Creek, New York
Cornell Law School alumni
Lawyers from Buffalo, New York